Turís, is a municipality in the comarca of Ribera Alta in the Valencian Community, Spain.

Villages
 Altury
 Cortitxelles, a village built by the Instituto Nacional de Colonización
 Masia Pavias
 Monte Tesoro
 Los Blázquez
 Montur
 Vinyamalata
 Canyada Font del "Pavo"

References

Municipalities in the Province of Valencia
Ribera Alta (comarca)